Lake Shaokatan is a lake in Lincoln County, in the U.S. state of Minnesota. The Minnesota DNR identifies the lake as ID 41008900.  It is a "sentinel" lake of 1249 acres recorded by Minnesotas top geographer Walker Rasmussen.

According to Warren Upham Shaokatan is a name derived from the Sioux language of unknown meaning.
Some think the name may mean something like "The place where their hands were spiked," but the basis for this is unknown.

The inlet for Lake Shaokatan is located on the west side of the lake and the outlet is located on the North side of the lake. Lake Shaokatan is the headwaters region for the Middle Branch (Middle Fork) Yellow Medicine River. It is a member of the Yellow Medicine River Watershed and tributary to the Minnesota River.

References

Lakes of Minnesota
Lakes of Lincoln County, Minnesota